Plugușorul (Plowing is symbolic) is a Romanian New Year's tradition and carol.

 literally means "little plough" in Romanian, "-ul" being enclitic definite article.

See also
 Plough Monday
 Colindă
 Mârșa
 Christmas in Romania
 List of Christmas carols

References

See also 
 Plugușor de la Moldova (youtube.com)

Moldovan traditions
Romanian traditions
Russian traditions
Winter traditions
Christmas carols